The 1946 Kansas State Wildcats football team was an American football team that represented Kansas State University in the Big Six Conference during the 1946 college football season. The team's head football coach was Hobbs Adams, in his first and only year of his second tenure as coach of the Wildcats. The team compiled a 0–9 record (0–5 against conference opponents), finished in last place in the Big Six, and were outscored by a total of 233 to 41. They ranked 119th out of 120 major college teams in scoring offense with an average of 4.6 points scored per game. On defense, they ranked 113th, giving up an average of 25.9 points per game.

Two Kansas State players received honors from the Associated Press (AP) or United Press (UP) on the 1946 All-Big Six Conference football team: tackle Howard Heath (UP-3); and guard Edgar McNeil (UP-3).

The Wildcats played their home games in Memorial Stadium.

Schedule

References

Kansas State
Kansas State Wildcats football seasons
College football winless seasons
Kansas State Wildcats football